The following is a list of people executed by the U.S. state of Texas between 1920 and 1929. A total of 66 people were executed during this period. From 1920 to 1923, ten people were executed by hanging. The last hanging in the state was that of Nathan Lee, a man convicted of murder and executed in Brazoria County on August 31, 1923. The law was changed in 1923 requiring executions be carried out on the electric chair and that they take place at the Huntsville Unit in Huntsville, Texas. From 1924 to 1929, 56 people were executed by electrocution, the first 5 people executed by this method took place on February 8, 1924 (this remains a state record for the number of executions in a single day).

Executions in Texas

By hanging: 1920–1923

By electrocution: 1924–1929

Interesting Statistics 
 100% of people executed from 1920 to 1929 were male.
 In 1924, of the 13 people executed, there was only one rape. All other crimes were murder.

See also

Capital punishment in Texas

References

External links
Death Row 1923-1973. Texas Department of Criminal Justice

1920
20th-century executions by Texas
1920s-related lists
1920s in Texas